Murraya is a genus of flowering plants in the citrus family, Rutaceae. It is distributed in Asia, Australia, and the Pacific Islands. The center of diversity is in southern China and Southeast Asia. When broadly circumscribed, the genus has about 17 species. A narrower circumscription contains only eight species, others being placed in Bergera and Merrillia.

Description
Plants in the genus Murraya are shrubs or trees with pinnate leaves arranged alternately, usually glandular, aromatic, and leathery to membranous in texture. The leaflets vary in shape and have smooth or toothed edges. The inflorescence is a panicle, cyme, or small raceme of flowers growing at the ends of branches or in the leaf axils; some flowers are solitary. The fragrant flowers have 4 or 5 sepals and white petals and up to 10 straight stamens. The fruit is a fleshy berry with pulp but without the juice vesicles present in some related fruits. It is up to 1.3 centimeters long and orange, red, or black.

Taxonomy
The genus Murraya was first formally described in 1771 by Carl Linnaeus in Mantissa Plantarum Altera from an unpublished description by Johann Gerhard König. The genus name commemorates the 18th-century German-Swedish herbal doctor Johan Andreas Murray, a student of Linnaeus. In 1986, Paul P.-H. But and co-authors separated off some species of Murraya as M. sect. Bergera based on chemical evidence. Evidence from pollen morphology and multiple molecular phylogenetic studies showed that when broadly circumscribed, Murraya was not monophyletic, and treating M. sect. Bergera as the separate genus Bergera has widespread support.

Murraya is in the subfamily Aurantioideae, which also includes the genus Citrus. It is in the tribe Clauseneae.

Species list
Studies have repeatedly shown that two sections into which Murraya has been divided, M. sect. Murraya and M. sect. Bergera, should be treated as separate genera. Murraya sensu stricto was revised in 2021, with eight species being accepted:
 Murraya alata Drake – China Southeast, Hainan, Vietnam
 Murraya elongata A.DC. ex Hook.f. – Myanmar
 Murraya glenieii Thwaites ex Oliv. – Sri Lanka
 Murraya lucida (G.Forst.) Mabb. – Vanuatu
 Murraya omphalocarpa Hayata
 Murraya paniculata (L.) Jack – Tropical Asia to Vanuatu and Australia
 Murraya sumatrana Roxb.
 Murraya zollingeri (Tanaka) F.J.Mou
Species that have been placed in Murraya sect. Bergera belong in Bergera, although , names for many have not been published. Further species still accepted in Murraya by Plants of the World Online are:
 Murraya caloxylon Ridl. – Malayasia, Thailand; synonym of Merrillia caloxylon
 Murraya crenulata (Turcz.) Oliv. – Taiwan (Lan Yü) to Malesia and SW. Pacific; placed in M. sect. Bergera
 Murraya cyclopensis Astuti & Rugayah – W. New Guinea
 Murraya euchrestifolia Hayata – China South-Central, China Southeast, Hainan, Taiwan; placed in M. sect. Bergera
 Murraya exotica L. – China South-Central, China Southeast, Hainan, Taiwan
 Murraya glabra (Guillaumin) Swingle – Vietnam
 Murraya heptaphylla Span. – Lesser Sunda Islands (Timor)
 Murraya koenigii (L.) Spreng. – Indian Subcontinent to China (S. Yunnan, Guangdong) and Indo-China, S. Hainan; synonym of Bergera koenigii
 Murraya kwangsiensis (C.C.Huang) C.C.Huang – China (SE. Yunnan, W. & SW. Guangxi); placed in M. sect. Bergera
 Murraya macrophylla (C.C.Huang) F.J.Mou & D.X.Zhang – China
 Murraya microphylla (Merr. & Chun) Swingle – China (Guangdong), Hainan; placed in M. sect. Bergera
 Murraya tetramera C.C.Huang – China (SE. Yunnan, W. Guangxi); placed in M. sect. Bergera

Uses
Murraya species are used in landscaping. Some species can be grafted onto citrus rootstocks. Species have been used in traditional medicine, with various parts of the plants used to treat fever, pain, and dysentery. M. paniculata has been used to induce labor. It has been used in Cuba for painful inflammatory conditions.

In Myanmar, Murraya species are used to make thanaka, a cosmetic paste that is typically applied onto the face.

Chemistry
Compounds isolated from Murraya include many types of coumarins and alkaloids. The novel alkaloid yuehchukene was found in M. paniculata, and it has since been isolated from other Murraya. It is found in red-fruited species with larger petals, but not in black-fruited species with smaller petals. Some species also contain the carbazole girinimbine.

Spelling competition
In July 2021, 14-year old Zaila Avant-garde of Harvey, Louisiana, won the final of the 2021 Scripps National Spelling Bee by correctly spelling the word "Murraya", and was the first African American to win the 96-year-old event.

References

 
Aurantioideae genera